Siri Skare (6 June 1958 – 1 April 2011) was the first female aviator in the armed forces of Norway. She died during a demonstration in Mazar-i-Sharif in 2011.

Early life
Skare was originally from Åndalsnes, Møre og Romsdal, Norway. A resident of Oslo, Skare was married and had one child.

Career
Already a civilian pilot and flight instructor with more than 1400 hours, she completed her military pilot training in 1984, and went on to fly Lockheed P-3 Orion at 333 Squadron and later Lockheed C-130 Hercules at 335 Squadron. She achieved the rank of lieutenant colonel within the Royal Norwegian Air Force.

Skare became a military advisor to the United Nations Assistance Mission in Afghanistan, in August 2010.

Death
Skare was killed at the United Nations Assistance Mission in Afghanistan (UNAMA) compound during a protest in Mazar-i-Sharif on 1 April 2011, and two other UNAMA staff died along with their four armed security guards and a number of protesters.

Her remains were transported to a ceremony that was held in a hangar at Gardermoen, with Crown Prince Haakon and Minister of Defence Grete Faremo in attendance. Her grave is at Grytten churchyard in Rauma.

References

1958 births
2011 deaths
Women aviators
Royal Norwegian Air Force personnel
Norwegian aviators
Norwegian military personnel killed in the War in Afghanistan (2001–2021)
Military personnel from Oslo
People from Møre og Romsdal
Norwegian female military personnel
Women in 21st-century warfare
Women in war in South Asia
Norwegian women aviators
20th-century Norwegian women